This list shows airports that are served by Air Koryo. Scheduled services are only operated from Pyongyang to Beijing, Chongjin, Samjiyon, Shenyang, and Vladivostok; additional destinations not listed on their website but showing up elsewhere as charters or seasonal charter services are also included.

Destinations

Notes

References

Lists of airline destinations
North Korea transport-related lists